Chen Lisha (born 10 April 1981) is a female sprinter from PR China who specialized in the 200 metres. Her personal best time is 22.94 seconds, achieved in May 2005 in Chongqing.

Achievements

References

1981 births
Living people
Chinese female sprinters
Universiade medalists in athletics (track and field)
Universiade gold medalists for China
Medalists at the 2003 Summer Universiade
21st-century Chinese women